Bulbophyllum triflorum is a species of orchid in the genus Bulbophyllum.Found in Sumatra to Western Java at elevations of up to 1600 meters

References
The Bulbophyllum-Checklist
The Internet Orchid Species Photo Encyclopedia

triflorum